Elmer Modlin (1925–2003) was an American film and television actor. He settled in Europe, working frequently in Spain. He was married to the artist Margaret Modlin. He is sometimes credited as Elmer Modling.

Selected filmography
 Rosemary's Baby (1968) - Young Man in Castevet apartment (uncredited)
 The Christian Licorice Store (1971) - Last Party Guest
 The Rebellious Novice (1971) - Martínez (uncredited)
 Love and Pain and the Whole Damn Thing (1973) - Dr. Edelheidt
 Un curita cañón (1974) - Reverendo Barley
 Una mujer prohibida (1974)
 The New Spaniards (1974) - Richard J. Foster
 Duerme, duerme, mi amor (1975) - Ligón extranjero (uncredited)
 Zorrita Martinez (1975) - Americano
 La querida (1976) - Invitado de la fiesta (uncredited)
 Ellas los prefieren... locas (1976)
 El diputado (1978)
 Venus de fuego (1978)
 Los energéticos (1979) - Ramiro
 La mujer del ministro (1981) - Espía (uncredited)
 Vatican Conspiracy (1982)
 Black Venus (1983) - French Minister (uncredited)
 Power Game (1983)
 Los viajes de Gulliver (1983) - Fisherman (voice)
 Histoire d'O: Chapitre 2 (1984)
 Rustlers' Rhapsody (1985) - Real Estate Broker
 La pantalla diabólica (1985)
 Beaks: The Movie (1986) - T.V. Director
 Edge of the Axe (1988) - Reverendo Clinton
 Oro fino (1989)

References

Bibliography
 Cowie, Peter. World Filmography 1968. Tantivy Press, 1968.

External links

1925 births
2003 deaths
American male film actors
American male television actors
American expatriates in Spain
American emigrants to Spain
People from North Carolina
20th-century American male actors